UPG can refer to:

 Union of the Gabonese People (Union du Peuple Gabonais)
 Unverified personal gnosis
 University of Pittsburgh at Greensburg
 the IATA airport code for Hasanuddin International Airport, Makassar, Indonesia